Mamta Mohandas is an Indian actress, film producer and a playback singer who predominantly works in Malayalam,Telugu and Tamil films. She has won several accolades including two Filmfare Awards South for Best Female Playback Singer in Telugu in 2006 and for Best Actress in Malayalam in 2010 and also Kerala State Film Award for Second Best Actress in 2010. She has launched her own film production company under the banner Mamta Mohandas Productions.

Early life and background

Mohandas was born to Malayali parents (Mohandas and Ganga) from Kannur. She attended the Indian School, Bahrain until 2002. She pursued a bachelor's degree in computer science at Mount Carmel College Bangalore. She modeled for print ads for companies such as IBM and Kalyan Kendra, and modeled on the ramp for the Mysore Maharajah and Raymonds. Mamta is trained in Carnatic music and Hindustani music.

Film career

Acting

Mohandas debuted in the 2005 Malayalam film Mayookham, directed by Hariharan. The film did not do well at the box office.

Subsequently, she acted alongside Mammootty in Bus Conductor, with Suresh Gopi in the films Adbutham (2006) and Lanka (2006), and alongside Jayaram in Madhuchandralekha (2006). She also played the female lead in Baba Kalyani with Mohanlal. Later that year, she débuted in the Tamil film industry, starring in the Karu Pazhaniappan directed film Sivappathigaram.

In 2007 she acted with Mammootty in the film Big B. She eventually stepped into the Telugu film industry as well, when she appeared in a supporting role in the film Yamadonga, directed by SS Rajamouli. She had lent her voice for a couple of songs in this film too. In 2008, she appeared in 7 films, predominantly in Telugu-language films. Her first release was her début Kannada film Gooli. She then starred in the film Krishnarjuna, playing the lead female role. Victory was her next assignment as lead actress, following which she appeared in a cameo role in her only Tamil release that year, Kuselan. Three more Telugu releases featured Mamta, including Homam, directed by JD Chakravarthy and Srinu Vaitla's King.

In 2009, she starred in the comedy film Guru En Aalu alongside Madhavan, and the thriller Passenger, sharing screen space with Dileep and Sreenivasan, respectively. The film Passenger, in which she played the role of a television reporter, became a turning point in Mohandas's career. She was initially approached to play the lead role in the 2009 Telugu dark fantasy Arundathi. She refused the offer, and the movie went on to become one of the highest grossers that year. In 2010, she worked with Jayaram in Kadha Thudarunnu directed by Sathyan Anthikkad, for which she won her first Best Actress Award from Filmfare. This film also won her the Kerala State Film Award for Second Best Actress, the Vanitha award for best actress – Malayalam, the Mathrubhumi award for best actress – Malayalam and the Asianet award for the best actress- Malayalam. Other projects in 2010 included Musafir with Rahman, Anwar with Prithiviraj, and Kedi with Nagarjuna. Mamta's first film in 2011 was the Malayalam film Race, in which she played the role of Niya, wife of a cardio surgeon Abey (Kunchacko Boban). The film failed to do well at the box office. Her next release in Malayalam was Naayika. In 2012, she appeared in her third Tamil film, Thadaiyara Thaakka, directed by Magizh Thirumeni. In 2013 she starred in Paisa Paisa with Indrajith. In 2014 she starred in To Noora with Love as a Muslim character.

Mohandas made a comeback to Malayalam movie industry with Ranjith Shankar's Mammooty starrer Varsham. She shared her screen space again with Dileep in Two Countries after doing My Boss with him.

In 2016, Mohandas starred opposite Mammootty in Thoppil Joppan, and in early 2017, she signed Crossroad, an anthology film in which she plays an orthodox Muslim. She also appeared in an extended cameo in Udaharanam Sujatha with Manju Warrier. In mid-2017, she signed Detroit Crossing aka Ranam opposite Prithviraj, but had to opt out because she did not have fresh dates to allocate for the project.

In 2020 Mohandas acted in the crime thriller feature film Forensic in which she played the role of police officer Rithika Xavier IPS .

Singing

Mohandas is trained in Carnatic and Hindustani music, and first sang playback in the Telugu film Rakhi, singing the title song under Devi Sri Prasad's direction, making her debut in the Telugu film industry as a singer before making her acting debut in Telugu. She went on to win the 2006 Filmfare Best Female Playback Singer Award for that song.

Subsequently, she was asked to sing several songs for composer Devi Sri Prasad, including "Akalesthe Annam Pedtha" for the Chiranjeevi-starrer Shankardada Zindabad (later dubbed as Daddy Mummy in the Tamil film Villu), "36-24-36" for the film Jagadam, "Mia" for Tulasi, and "Ghanana (Funny)" and the title song for the film King. Other music directors she has worked with include M. M. Keeravani (for her own films Yamadonga and Krishnarjuna, also Chandamama), R. P. Patnaik (for Andamaina Mansulo), Chakri (for Victory), Nithin Raikwar (for her own film Homam) and Thaman (for Jayeebhava).

In Tamil, she sang "Kaalai Kaalai" in the film Kaalai, which starred Silambarasan in the lead role. She sang "Idai Vazhi" for the comedy film Goa under noted composer Yuvan Shankar Raja's direction. Both songs featured her singing alongside Benny Dayal. She was heard for the first time in her mother tongue, Malayalam, in the 2010 film Anwar. She has also recorded a song for her film Thriller. In the film 'Mohabath', she sang a duet with Hariharan. She sang "Iravil Viriyum" in her 2012 film Arike. She sang "Karuppana Kannazhagi" in the film Aadupuliyattam.

Personal life
Mohandas got engaged to Prajith Padmanabhan, a Bahrain-based businessman, on 11 November 2011. They married on 28 December 2011 in Thalassery. On 12 December 2012, the couple applied for divorce.

Mohandas is a cancer survivor, and has battled Hodgkin lymphoma since 2010. In April 2013, she had a relapse of the cancer and underwent cancer treatment in UCLA. Since 2014, she has resided in Los Angeles.

Discography

Filmography

Voice cast
 2021: Sunny as Dr. Anuradha
 2022 : Theerppu as Dr. Shwetha

Other work
In 2012, Mohandas started working in television, hosting the quiz show Kayyil Oru Kodi on Surya TV, which was later cancelled. She also judged the show D 4 Dance.

She was the brand ambassador of 2011 Kochi International Fashion Week (KIWF).

Mohandas was the brand ambassador along with actress Bhavana for the team Kerala Strikers for the Celebrity Cricket League (CCL) held in 2013, captained by Mohanlal, who is also one of the owners of the team, and vice-captain Indrajith Sukumaran. On 14 November 2020, Mohandas launched her own production company Mamta Mohandas Productions.

Television

Awards

 Kerala State Film Awards
 2010: Second Best Actress – Kadha Thudarunnu

 Asianet Film Awards
 2010: Best Popular Actress – Kadha Thudarunnu
 2010: Nominated – Best Actress – Kadha Thudarunnu
 2013: Best Popular Actress – My Boss

 South Indian Filmfare Awards
 2006: Won- Best Female Playback Singer in Telugu – Rakhi
 2009: Nominated- Best Actress – Passenger
 2010: Won- Best Actress – Kadha Thudarunnu
 2008: Nominated- Best Supporting Actress – Yamadonga
 2013: Nominated- Best Actress – Arike
 2013: Nominated- Best Playback Singer – Female – Arike
 2014: Nominated- Best Actress – Celluloid
 2016: Nominated- Best Actress – Two Countries

Vanitha Film Awards
 2011: Best Actress – Kadha Thudarunnu
 2016: Best Star Pair – Two Countries
 2020: Special Performance Female – Kodathi Samaksham Balan Vakeel,9

IIFA Utsavam
  Nominated – 2017: Best Playback Singer – Female -Aadupuliyattam

Asiavision Awards
  Nominated – 2013: Best Actress -Celluloid, My Boss
  Won – 2016: Woman of the Year
  Won – 2017: Pride of South India

South Indian International Movie Awards
 Nominated – 2013: Best Female Playback Singer – Arike
 Nominated – 2016: Best Actress – Two Countries
 Nominated – 2018: Best Actress in a Supporting Role – Udaharanam Sujatha 
 Nominated - 2021 : Best Actress - Forensic
 Nominated - 2022 : Best Actress - Bhramam

 Mathrubhumi - Kalyan Silks Chalachithra Awards
 2010: Best Actress – Kadha Thudarunnu

Asianet Comedy Awards
2016: Best Actress - Two Countries

References

External links
 
 

Year of birth missing (living people)
Living people
People from Manama
Indian expatriates in Bahrain
Indian film actresses
Actresses in Tamil cinema
Actresses in Malayalam cinema
Actresses in Telugu cinema
Indian women playback singers
Tamil playback singers
Telugu playback singers
Malayalam playback singers
Kerala State Film Award winners
Mount Carmel College, Bangalore alumni
21st-century Indian actresses
21st-century Indian women singers
21st-century Indian singers
Filmfare Awards winners
Filmfare Awards South winners